Myszkowice may refer to the following places in Poland:
Myszkowice, Lower Silesian Voivodeship (south-west Poland)
Myszkowice, Masovian Voivodeship (east-central Poland)
Myszkowice, Silesian Voivodeship (south Poland)

See also
 Myczkowce, a village in the administrative district of Gmina Solina, Lesko County, Subcarpathian Voivodeship, south-eastern Poland